Derek Scott is a Scottish curler.

He is a  silver medallist, bronze medallist and three-time Scottish men's champion.

Teams

Membership of Errol curling club
Derek Scott was a member of Errol curling club (Perthshire), Scotland for 29 seasons, joining in 1961-62, with his last season as a member being 1990-91. He served as President of the club in 1967-68.

References

External links
 

Living people
Scottish male curlers
Scottish curling champions
Year of birth missing (living people)